National Route 349 is a national highway of Japan connecting Mito, Ibaraki and Shibata, Miyagi, with a total length of 256.3 km (159.26 mi).

References

National highways in Japan
Roads in Fukushima Prefecture
Roads in Ibaraki Prefecture
Roads in Miyagi Prefecture